Metallolophia cineracea is a moth of the family Geometridae first described by Jeremy Daniel Holloway in 1996. It is found on Borneo and Peninsular Malaysia. The habitat consists of lowland heath forests.

The wingspan is 15–20 mm. The upperside of the wings above has a pale grey ground colour with a uniform irroration (sprinkling) of black scales. The underside is almost violet grey.

References

Moths described in 1996
Pseudoterpnini